"Happens Like That" is a song recorded by American country music singer Granger Smith. Released in May 2017 as the lead single to his second Wheelhouse Records album When the Good Guys Win, the song was co-written by Smith along with Justin Wilson, Andy Albert, and Florida Georgia Line's Tyler Hubbard. The song was inspired by Smith's wife, who also appears in the song's video, and its lyrics tell of the progression in a couple's relationship.

Content
Smith wrote "Happens Like That" with Justin Wilson, Andy Albert, and Florida Georgia Line member Tyler Hubbard. In an article for The Boot, Smith that the song was written while Smith was on tour with Florida Georgia Line, and the four of them wrote it "in just a couple hours". Thematically, the song is about the quick passage of time in a relationship. According to Smith, the song was inspired by his first encounter with his wife, Amber Bartlett, whom he met after she auditioned for a previous music video of his.

Critical reception
Billy Dukes of Taste of Country wrote that "Smith is a master at finding soft spots with easily accessible, precise lyrics" while praising the "down-the-middle arrangement".

Music video
The song's music video, directed by TK McKamy, recalls a love story similar to the one portrayed in the song. In it, Smith is alone in a field when a woman (portrayed by Bartlett) joins him and proposes to him. Afterward, the two of them portray a growing relationship that culminates in the arrival of a child (portrayed by the Smiths' youngest son River).

Chart performance

Weekly charts

Year-end charts

Certifications

References

2017 songs
2017 singles
Granger Smith songs
Songs written by Andy Albert
Songs written by Tyler Hubbard
Music videos directed by TK McKamy
BBR Music Group singles
Song recordings produced by Frank Rogers (record producer)